The Insurance Regulatory Unit (Arabic: وحدة تنظيم التأمين) was established in accordance with Law No. (125) of 2019 regarding the regulation of insurance issued in the Official Gazette on 01-09-2019, and according to the law, the unit regulates insurance activity and controls it in a manner that is fair, transparent and competitive, and develops insurance activity. In line with international best practices and providing protection for all stakeholders involved in the insurance activity.

Objectives 

 Regulates insurance market activities in a manner that is fair, transparent and competitive.
 Develops insurance activities and mechanisms in line with best international best practices.
 Providing protection for all stakeholders involved in insurance activities.
 Applies policies that achieves fairness, transparency and prevents conflict of interests.
 Ensures compliance with regulations pertaining to insurance activities.
 Raises public's awareness of insurance activities, benefits, risks, and legal obligations.

External links 
 Law (125) of 2019
 Bylaw of law (125) of 2019

References 

Insurance agents
Government agencies established in 2019
2019 establishments in Kuwait
Financial regulatory authorities